The imperial election of 20 October 1314 was an imperial election held to select the emperor of the Holy Roman Empire. It took place in Frankfurt.

Like the previous day's election, the meeting was called to elect the successor of Emperor Henry VII, who had died while in Italy on 24 August 1313. Henry's son John, King of Bohemia since 1310, was considered by many prince-electors to be too young, and by others to be already too powerful. While one day before three of the seven electors had elected Frederick the Fair, son of the late German king Albert I, the result was claimed to be invalid, due to the absence of the other four electors and the presence as fourth elector of Henry of Carinthia, the deposed King-Elector of Bohemia who still claimed the title against John.

The election was presided over by Peter of Aspelt, Archbishop of Mainz and member of the pro-Luxembourg party. Of seven electors only five attended the meeting, one of whom was disputed:
 Peter of Aspelt, Archbishop-Elector of Mainz
 Baldwin of Luxembourg, brother of Henry VII and Archbishop-Elector of Trier
 John, son of Henry VII and King-Elector of Bohemia
 Waldemar of Stendal, Elector of Brandenburg
 John II of Lauenburg, claimant Elector of Saxony against Rudolf I of Wittenberg

As a result of the election, Louis IV, Duke of Bavaria was elected Holy Roman Emperor. However, due to the unrecognized claim of John II of Lauenburg, the election was considered invalid by the electors who supported Frederick the Fair.

The two contested elections caused the eruption of a civil war inside the Holy Roman Empire, fought between pro-Luxembourg and pro-Habsburg parties. Louis was successfully crowned at Aachen - the customary site of coronations - by the Archbishop of Mainz, while the Archbishop of Cologne, who by custom had the right to crown the new king, crowned Frederick at Bonn. In the following conflict between the kings, Louis recognized the independence of Switzerland from the Habsburg dynasty in 1316.

After several years of bloody war, victory finally seemed within the grasp of Frederick, who was strongly supported by his brother Leopold. However, Frederick's army was decisively defeated in the Battle of Mühldorf on 28 September 1322 on the Ampfing Heath, where Frederick and 1300 nobles from Austria and Salzburg were captured. Louis was finally crowned Emperor in Rome on 17 January 1328 by Senator Giacomo Colonna, demoting the Pope's authority and introducing the tradition of imperial legitimacy only by election, not papal coronation.

References

1314
1314 in the Holy Roman Empire
14th-century elections
Non-partisan elections
Louis IV, Holy Roman Emperor